Ronnenberg is a town in the district of Hanover, in Lower Saxony, Germany. It is situated approximately 8 km southwest of Hanover.

Subdivisions
Besides Ronnenberg proper, the city consists of the boroughs of Benthe (including Sieben Trappen), Empelde, Ihme-Roloven, Linderte, Ronnenberg, Vörie, and Weetzen.

Mayors
2021–incumbent: Marlo Kratzke (SPD)
2014–2021: Stephanie Harms (CDU)
2001–2013: Wolfgang Walther (SPD).

Notable people 
Julius Bodenstab (1834–1916), Wisconsin farmer, legislator and real estate broker; a native of Ronnenberg
Fritz Warnecke (1898–1968), Wehrmacht Generalmajor during World War II; retired to and died in Ronnenberg
Johannes Weineck (1915–2005), Luftwaffe Hauptmann during World War II; retired to and died in Ronnenberg

References

Hanover Region